Plautia was a Roman woman of senatorial rank whom Classical scholars believe lived in the late first century and early second century AD. No direct evidence of her existence has yet been found. Ronald Syme comments about her situation, "Plautia exemplifies a common phenomenon in the history of Imperial Rome; a fragment of knowledge rescued from the waters of oblivion, but a figure of consequence in the social and political history of the time."

History
Edmund Groag first suggested her existence to explain otherwise baffling and contradictory statements about the familial relationships of senators related to the Antonine dynasty, taking her name from Avidia Plautia, daughter of Gaius Avidius Nigrinus, suffect consul in 110. Syme later identified more of her husbands and children, wryly commenting that while "it would be refreshing to discover aspects of social life not revealed in the correspondence of Pliny (divorce has no place in his decorous pages)", he admits the alternative to accepting Plautia's existence was to assume "Hadrian, freshly married to Vibia Sabina, chose to seduce the wife of Ceionius Commodus." More recently, Anthony Birley accepted her existence by placing her in his family tree of the relatives of Lucius Aelius Caesar, where she appears as the daughter of Lucius Aelius Lamia Plautius Aelianus, suffect consul in 80.

Issue
Plautia is believed to have married three different men, by whom she had at least four children:
 Lucius Ceionius Commodus, consul in 106
 Lucius Aelius Caesar, father of the emperor Lucius Verus;
 A Ceionius, identified as the surmised father of Marcus Caeionius Silvanus, consul in 156;
 Second wife of Gaius Avidius Nigrinus, suffect consul in 110, who died in the year 118
 Avidia Plautia who married Lucius Titius Epidius Aquilinus
 Second wife of Sextus Vettulenus Civica Cerialis, consul in 106
 Marcus Vettulenus Civica Barbarus, consul in 157

See also 
 Vistilia
 Postumia (mother of Decimus Brutus Albinus)

Notes

References

Further reading
Cassio Dione e l'impero romano da Nerva ad Antonino Pio: alla luce dei nuovi by Guido Migliorati, 2003 – Italian Historical Secondary Source
The Cambridge ancient history, Volume 11 by Alan K. Bowman, Peter Garnsey, Dominic Rathbone Limited preview - Edition: 2 - Item notes: v. 11 – 2000
Plutarch's Sertorius: A Historical Commentary by C. Konrad; Chapel Hill: University of North Carolina Press, 1994
Marcus Aurelius, by Anthony Richard Birley, Routledge, 2000
A Dictionary of the Roman Empire by Matthew Bunson – 1995

1st-century Roman women
2nd-century Roman women
Plautii
Unidentified people